Ruhubelent  is a town and the administrative center of Ruhubelent District of Daşoguz Province, Turkmenistan. The district was established in April 2007 and the town of Ruhubelent was founded on 17 October 2008.

Etymology
The word ruhubelent in Turkmen means "inspiring, inspirational".

Amenities
Facilities in Ruhubelent include the district governor's office, a police station, district prosecutor, national security office, courthouse, 320-seat school house, house of culture, 50-bed hospital, outpatient clinic, kindergarten, 24 two-story duplex houses, water purification plant, shopping mall, telephone and electrical service, railroad station, and a bank branch.

Transportation
The town is served by the Trans-Karakum Railway that connects Ashgabat and Daşoguz as well as the Ashgabat-Dashoguz Automobile Highway.

References

Populated places in Daşoguz Region